Damion Young (born 1974), better known by his stage name Damizza, is an American radio executive, record producer, artist and author.

Biography

He completed working with J. Marshall Craig on a book on his life, Guilty By Association, which is scheduled for release sometime late-2011 after two years of delays over legal issues and made some public appearances at various California universities and colleges discussing the book and his life as a radio prodigy-turned hip-hop producer and performer. When Damizza was asked to give a brief insight to his book he said "A kid from a small town with a dream.. That never took no for an answer, made his dreams come true and did it his way. (With a Lil help from his grannie)".

Awards/Chart Positions
 Damizza Presents... Where I Wanna Be: The Compilation No. 28 R&B/Hip-Hop No. 143 Billboard 200

References

External links
 Damizza on HipHopDX
 Damizza Interview on SoPrupRadio.com

Record producers from California
1972 births
Musicians from Santa Barbara, California
Place of birth missing (living people)
Living people